The Kirk Douglas Theatre is a 317-seat theater located in Culver City, California. Since 2004, it has been operated by the Center Theatre Group.

History
Built in 1946, as a Streamline Moderne movie palace with a seating capacity of 1,160 (on a stadium plan with no overhanging balcony), the Culver Theatre (as it was previously named) was located near the Columbia Pictures studio lot (then the lot for MGM). It opened on Wednesday August 13, 1947.

Originally, much like surrounding downtown Culver City, the Culver was a key part of classic Hollywood's thriving entertainment community. But, eventually, much of the entertainment industry moved to points north and the theater grew tired and worn over the years.

Today, the Culver, now renamed the Kirk Douglas Theatre, operates as a performing arts center and playhouse. An $8 million restoration project, with a $1.25 million grant from the City of Culver City, included the addition of two new stages, one with 100 seats and another with over 300 seats. Most of the exterior has been preserved, including the box office and the signature mezzanine tile.

Awards and nominations

References

Theatre companies in Los Angeles
Theatres in Los Angeles County, California
Streamline Moderne architecture in California
Theatres completed in 1947
1947 establishments in California
Buildings and structures in Culver City, California